Physalaemus erikae is a species of frog in the family Leptodactylidae. It is endemic to eastern Brazil and currently known only from southern Bahia, although it is likely that its range extends into nearby areas in northeastern Minas Gerais and northern Espírito Santo with similar vegetation.

Etymology
Physalaemus erikae is named for Erika Costa Elias, wife of Bruno Pimenta, one of the scientists who described the species.

Description
Adult males measure  and adult females  in snout–vent length. The body is robust. The snout is rounded. The tympanum is weakly distinct. The supratympanic fold runs from the posterior corner of the eye to the shoulder; immediately above it, a more or less weak dorsolateral fold runs to near the inguinal region. The fingers and the toes are long and have neither webbing nor expanded tips. Dorsal skin is warty with scattered short ridges or pairs of well-developed longitudinal ridges. Coloration is variable; preserved specimens may be brown with small black blotches on the dorsum and a black interorbital stripe (weak or absent in some specimens). Coloration may also be cream and light-brown; a white vertebral stripe can be present. Males have a large subgular vocal sac.

Habitat and conservation
Physalaemus erikae have been encountered in temporary ponds in cow pastures at the borders of Atlantic Rain Forest remnants, natural openings inside the forest, and cacao plantations. Males call from pond edges or floating in shallow water. Females have been spotted near ponds or dwelling on forest floor litter.

This species seems to benefit from some degree of degradation and opening of the forest canopy, but complete loss of forest cover is likely to have a negative impact on it. It has been recorded in the Serra Bonita Private Reserve of Natural Heritage.

References

erikae
Endemic fauna of Brazil
Amphibians of Brazil
Amphibians described in 2004
Taxonomy articles created by Polbot